Alessandro Fadini (born 4 May 1998) is an Italian figure skater. He has won a total of seven senior international medals, including medals at the Dragon Trophy (2017, 2018 silver; 2016 bronze), Egna Spring Trophy (2017, 2021 silver), Triglav Trophy (2018 silver), and Skate Celje (2021 silver).

Programs

Competitive highlights 
CS: Challenger Series; JGP: Junior Grand Prix

References

External links 
 

1998 births
Italian male single skaters
Living people
Sportspeople from Verona
21st-century Italian people